Ger Power (born 9 May 1960 in Midleton, County Cork) is a former Irish sportsperson. He played hurling with his local club Midleton and was the substitute goalkeeper to Ger Cunningham on the Cork senior inter-county team in the 1980s.

References

1960 births
Living people
Midleton hurlers
Cork inter-county hurlers